ISO 3166-2:VN is the entry for Vietnam in ISO 3166-2, part of the ISO 3166 standard published by the International Organization for Standardization (ISO), which defines codes for the names of the principal subdivisions (e.g., provinces or states) of all countries coded in ISO 3166-1.

Currently for Vietnam, ISO 3166-2 codes are defined for 58 provinces and 5 municipalities.  The municipalities have special status equal to the provinces.

Each code consists of two parts, separated by a hyphen. The second part either of the following:
 two digits: provinces
 two letters: municipalities

Current codes
Subdivision names are listed as in the ISO 3166-2 standard published by the ISO 3166 Maintenance Agency (ISO 3166/MA).

Click on the button in the header to sort each column. Names are sorted according to the Vietnamese alphabet: a, ă, â, b-d, đ, e, ê, f-o, ô, ơ, p-u, ư, v-z (with alphabetization proceeding on a word-by-word basis, e.g. all names starting with Hà sort before all names with Hải).

Changes
The following changes to the entry have been announced by the ISO 3166/MA since the first publication of ISO 3166-2 in 1998.  ISO stopped issuing newsletters in 2013.

See also
 Subdivisions of Vietnam
 FIPS region codes of Vietnam

External links
 ISO Online Browsing Platform: VN
 Provinces of Vietnam, Statoids.com

2:VN
ISO 3166-2
Vietnam geography-related lists